Dobletina is a settlement immediately south of Nazarje in Slovenia. The area belongs to the traditional region of Styria and is now included in the Savinja Statistical Region.

References

External links
Dobletina on Geopedia

Populated places in the Municipality of Nazarje